Ahsham-e Hajj Khurshid (also Romanized as Aḩsham-e Ḩājj Khūrshīd) is a village in Baghak Rural District, in the Central District of Tangestan County, Bushehr Province, Iran. At the 2006 census, its population was 70, in 18 families.

References 

Populated places in Tangestan County